Avgi (before 1928: Μπρέστενη - Bresteni, renamed until 1929: Κρύα Νερά - Krya Nera) is a village in Kastoria Regional Unit, Macedonia, Greece.

The Greek census (1920) recorded 312 people in the village and in 1923 there were 200 inhabitants (or 40 families) who were Muslim. Following the Greek-Turkish population exchange, in 1926 within Bresteni there were refugee families from East Thrace (2), Asia Minor (8), Pontus (5), the Caucasus (22) and one other from an unidentified location. The Greek census (1928) recorded 265 village inhabitants. There were 39 refugee families (143 people) in 1928. After the population exchange, the Pontian refugees who settled in the village demolished its mosque.

References

Populated places in Kastoria (regional unit)